alt.suicide.holiday (a.s.h, ASH or ash) is a Usenet newsgroup. Its original purpose was to discuss the relationship between suicide rates and holiday seasons. However, it has since evolved into a broad discussion forum where suicidal people can openly share their thoughts. Some participants are not suicidal, but post to provide psychological support or advice on how to kill oneself to suicidal or depressed posters. The newsgroup is unmoderated and subject to a high level of trolling and a harsh and sometimes hostile atmosphere. According to its FAQ, its purpose is neither to encourage nor discourage suicide.

Effects
Research from 2007 shows that suicide websites indeed could be more efficient in providing emotional help for people contemplating suicide than suicide hotlines. Primary reasons are asynchronous nature of discussion in newsgroups giving enough time for thoughtful response and group-based discussion that suicidal people find reassuring. High degree of anonymity is another advantage of newsgroups like a.s.h, allowing people to openly talk about their feelings without fear of consequences.

UK Byron Review for 2008, analyzing effects of websites on children, says that "research looking at pro-suicide sites has had mixed results. Some studies report high degrees of emotional and social support by these sites, particularly on sites where the methods of suicide were not discussed. More studies like this are needed to begin to understand the impact of such sites on those who spontaneously choose to access them."

Suicide information
A.s.h does not censor information on suicide methods and does not prohibit such discussion. Opponents see discussion of suicide methods as potentially endangering vulnerable people - people who would otherwise live through crisis, might commit suicide given information on lethal methods.

Supporters of open discussion state that methods information is widely and legally available; that information might prevent number of permanent injuries resulting from lack of knowledge about methods, like paracetamol overdoses.

Coverage in the news
The newsgroup has been a target of news reports alleging a direct relationship between "avoidable" suicides and the suicide-facilitating nature of the newsgroup and web site.

In 2003, a.s.h was the topic of a series of Wired articles under the pretext of examining the group's role in the deaths of several depressed individuals. The accuracy and integrity of the articles was widely disputed by ashers and internet media critics, e.g., Ken Hagler's Radio Weblog: No One Asked Why He Wanted to Die.

A.s.h played some role in the death of Suzy Gonzales, who killed herself in 2003 after sharing her thoughts on a.s.h. In the US, the death of Suzy Gonzales led to an attempt to introduce a controversial H.R. 940: Suzanne Gonzales Suicide Prevention Act of 2007, which did not pass. The current version of the bill is HR 1183: Suzanne Gonzales Suicide Prevention Act of 2011.

The community received further media attention due to the case of William Francis Melchert-Dinkel, who was charged with encouraging the suicides of a person in Britain in 2005 and another person in Canada in 2008 through a.s.h.

Coverage in other media
 A.s.h World Wide Suicide (2002) (TV), a documentary about a.s.h
 Norway.today is a theatrical drama inspired by a true story. A young Norwegian man and a young Austrian girl agreed a suicide pact on a.s.h, and jumped to death from Prekestolen (Pulpit Rock). Their tent, some beer, and a stereo were eventually found there. Wired Magazine reported on the original story. Norway.today was the most played performance in Germany in years 2003 and 2004, it was translated in 20 languages and played in over 100 theaters.
 In 2004, Law & Order: Special Victims Unit aired an episode called "Painless", which revolved around a website with a similar philosophy called "CatchingTheTrain.com".

Terminology
 Ticket
 Refers to having all the tools and preparations collected and readied to complete a suicide, i.e., a ticket for the "bus".
 Catch the bus
 Commonly shorted to "CTB", is a euphemism for suicide.

See also
 Seasonal effects on suicide rates
 Social media and suicide
 Sanctioned Suicide
 Suicide
 Suicide methods

References

Suicide prevention
Suicide and the Internet
Usenet alt.* hierarchy